Jim McGuire in an American college baseball coach, currently serving as head coach of the Middle Tennessee Blue Raiders baseball program.  He was named to that position prior to the 2013 season.

McGuire's playing career began in 1982 at Illinois State.  After one season, he transferred to Rend Lake, a junior college.  He then completed his eligibility at Division II Cumberland.  McGuire spent the 1986 season as an assistant at UMSL.  He then returned to Rend Lake, serving two seasons as an assistant before being elevated to the top job in 1989.  After four years, he joined Middle Tennessee as an assistant.  He served as an assistant for eight years before becoming associate head coach following the 2000 season.  McGuire was named head coach after the 2012 season.

Head coaching record
The following lists McGuire's record as a head coach at the Division I level.

See also
List of current NCAA Division I baseball coaches

References

Living people
Sportspeople from Belleville, Illinois
Cumberland Phoenix baseball players
Illinois State Redbirds baseball players
Rend Lake Warriors baseball coaches
Rend Lake Warriors baseball players
Middle Tennessee Blue Raiders baseball coaches
UMSL Tritons baseball coaches
Year of birth missing (living people)